Lioptilodes antarcticus is a species of moth in the genus Lioptilodes known from Argentina and Chile. Moths of this species take flight in May, October, December and January, and have a wingspan of 20–21 millimetres. The host plant is a species of Adesmia.

References

Platyptiliini
Moths described in 1899